Samuel Joelah Tribble (November 15, 1869 – December 8, 1916) was an American politician and lawyer.

Tribble was born near Carnesville, Georgia and attended the University of Georgia in Athens. He was a member of the Demosthenian Literary Society and graduated in 1891 with a Bachelor of Law (LL.B.) degree. He was admitted to the state bar that same year and began practice in Athens. From 1899 to 1904, Tribble was the solicitor of the City Court of Athens. In 1904, he became the solicitor general of the western circuit of Georgia and served in that capacity until 1908.

In 1910, Tribble ran for the United States House of Representatives as a Democrat against incumbent William Marcellus Howard and won election to the 62nd United States Congress. He won re-election to that seat for two additional terms and served from March 4, 1911, until his death while in office on December 8, 1916, in Washington, D.C. Tribble was buried in Oconee Hill Cemetery in Athens, Georgia.

See also
List of United States Congress members who died in office (1900–49)

External links

References

History of the University of Georgia, Thomas Walter Reed,  Imprint:  Athens, Georgia : University of Georgia, ca. 1949, pp.1595-1597
Samuel J. Tribble, late a representative from Georgia, Memorial addresses delivered in the House of Representatives and Senate frontispiece 1917

1869 births
1916 deaths
People from Carnesville, Georgia
University of Georgia alumni
Georgia (U.S. state) lawyers
Democratic Party members of the United States House of Representatives from Georgia (U.S. state)
19th-century American politicians
19th-century American lawyers